The 2008 Mexican Figure Skating Championships took place between 12 and 17 November 2007 in Guadalajara. Skaters competed in the disciplines of men's singles and ladies' singles on the senior level. The results were used to choose the Mexican teams to the 2008 World Championships and the 2008 Four Continents Figure Skating Championships.

Senior results

Men

Ladies

External links
 results

Mexican Figure Skating Championships, 2008
Mex
Figure Skating Championships, 2008
Fig
Mexican Figure Skating Championships